The Magic of Ju-Ju is an album by Archie Shepp released on Impulse! Records in May 1968. The album contains tracks recorded by Shepp, trumpeter Martin Banks, trombonist Mike Zwerin, bassist Reggie Workman and percussionists Norman Connors, Frank Charles, Dennis Charles, Ed Blackwell and Beaver Harris in April of 1967.

Reception
The Allmusic review by Al Campbell states of the title track "Shepp's emotional and fiery tenor takes off immediately, gradually morphing with the five percussionists who perform on instruments including rhythm logs and talking drums. Shepp never loses the initial energy, moving forward like a man possessed as the drumming simultaneously builds into a fury. Upon the final three minutes, the trumpets of Martin Banks and Michael Zwerin make an abrupt brief appearance, apparently to ground the piece to a halt. This is one of Shepp's most chaotic yet rhythmically hypnotic pieces".

Track listing 
 "The Magic of Ju-Ju" - 18:37
 "You're What This Day Is All About" - 1:51
 "Shazam!" - 4:43
 "Sorry 'Bout That" - 10:07
All compositions by Archie Shepp
 Recorded at Rudy Van Gelder Studio, Englewood Cliffs, NJ, April 26, 1967

Personnel 
 Archie Shepp: tenor saxophone
 Martin Banks: trumpet, flugelhorn
 Mike Zwerin: bass trombone, trombone
 Reggie Workman: bass
 Norman Connors: drums
 Beaver Harris: drums
 Frank Charles: talking drum
 Dennis Charles: percussion
 Ed Blackwell: rhythm logs

References 

Archie Shepp albums
Impulse! Records albums
Albums produced by Bob Thiele
Albums recorded at Van Gelder Studio
cine